The Way We Live Right Now was a BBC Radio Four adaptation of the Anthony Trollope novel The Way We Live Now, re-setting it in the present day.  It was written by Jonathan Myerson for the Woman's Hour serial.

Cast
Henry Goodman - Ghassan Mehmoud
Dexter Fletcher -‘Flex’ Carbury
John Rowe - Anthony Trollope
Nyasha Hatendi - Paul Montague
David Bamber - Rt. Hon. Jeremy Longstaff
Lucy Montgomery - Georgiana Longstaff
Sheridan Smith - Ruby Ruggles
Chipo Chung - Marie Mehmoud
Ben Crowe - Roger Lloyd-Montague
Emily Wachter - Hetta Carbury
Annette Badland - Tilly Carbury 
Liz Sutherland - Helen Croll
Stephen Critchlow - Nick Broune

External links
Woman's Hour Drama - homepage

BBC Radio 4 programmes